The Canberra Press Gallery, officially called the Federal Parliamentary Press Gallery, is the name given to the approximately 180 journalists and their support staff, including producers, editors and camera crews, who report the workings of the Australian Parliament. The name derives from the press galleries, which are enclosed viewing areas above the chambers of the Senate and the House of Representatives, which the President and the Speaker have allocated to the media.

Use of the name 
The expression "Canberra Press Gallery" also refers to the association of Gallery journalists which represents their professional interests in dealing with the Parliament. The current President of the Gallery is David Speers, host and presenter for ABC TV's Insiders. The vice-president is Andrew Meares and the secretary is Eliza Borrello.

Apart from the one and a half hours per sitting day of Question Time, journalists spend little time in the actual press gallery overlooking the floor of Parliament. Another area, also named the "press gallery" refers to the office space within the Parliament building, above the Senate chamber which includes television studios and radio booths where the gallery journalists spend most of their time compiling stories and communicating with editors.

Role and influence 
Australian academics have described the gallery as 'collectively responsible for the great majority of news stories about federal politics that appear in Australian Print and broadcast media'. 

Many of Australia's most influential journalists, such as Paul Bongiorno, Malcolm Farr, Michelle Grattan, Laurie Oakes, Mark Riley, Hugh Riminton, Dennis Shanahan, Karen Middleton, Sharri Markson, Chris Uhlmann and David Speers are gallery members.

Media affiliations 
Studios for the major TV networks are among the gallery; including the ABC, SBS, Channel Nine, Sky News, Channel Seven, Network Ten and other media partners. 

Major newspapers that participate in the gallery include The Australian Financial Review, The Sydney Morning Herald, The Age, The Australian, The Daily Telegraph, the Herald Sun, The Courier-Mail, The West Australian, The Advertiser, The Canberra Times and Inside Canberra, as well as playing host to Fairfax radio's 2UE/3AW and to Sydney station 2GB.

References

External links 
The Prime Minister and the Press: A Study in Intimacy (Michelle Grattan reflects on the history of the Press Gallery)
Australia’s Federal Parliamentary Press Gallery (official website)

Australian journalism organisations
Politics of Australia
Mass media in Australian Capital Territory
Press galleries